Askeptosauridae is a family of thalattosaurs within the superfamily Askeptosauroidea. Fossils have been found from Italy, Switzerland, and China. Askeptosaurids are distinguished from other thalattosaurs by their long necks and narrow skulls.

Classification
Askeptosauridae was named in 1952 to include the genus Askeptosaurus. In 2000, the genus Anshunsaurus, which includes two species, was added to the family. In a 2005 phylogenetic analysis, Endennasaurus was included within Askeptosauridae. Later that year a new study placed Endennasaurus outside Askeptosauridae as a basal member of Askeptosauroidea. More recent studies have placed the genus Miodentosaurus from China in the family as well. Below is a cladogram modified from Wu et al. (2009) showing the phylogenetic relationships of askeptosaurids:

References

Thalattosaurs
Triassic first appearances
Triassic extinctions
Prehistoric reptile families